Claudio Gomes Osorio (born 26 September 2002) is an English professional footballer who plays as a midfielder for the EFL Championship club Reading.

Career
In September 2019, Osorio signed his first professional contract with Reading. He made his professional debut with the club in a 3–0 EFL Cup loss to Swansea City on 10 August 2021.

International career
Osorio is a youth international for England, having represented the England U15s in 2016.

References

External links
 

2002 births
Living people
English footballers
England youth international footballers
Reading F.C. players
Association football midfielders